Stiphropella is a genus of spiders in the family Thomisidae. It was first described in 1952 by Lawrence. , it contains only one species, Stiphropella gracilis, found in South Africa.

References

Thomisidae
Monotypic Araneomorphae genera
Spiders of South Africa